Campanology is the scientific and musical study of bells. It encompasses the technology of bells – how they are founded, tuned and rung – as well as the history, methods, and traditions of bellringing as an art.

It is common to collect together a set of tuned bells and treat the whole as one musical instrument. Such collectionssuch as a Flemish carillon, a Russian zvon, or an English "ring of bells" used for change ringinghave their own practices and challenges; and campanology is likewise the study of perfecting such instruments and composing and performing music for them.

In this sense, however, the word campanology is most often used in reference to relatively large bells, often hung in a tower. It is not usually applied to assemblages of smaller bells, such as a glockenspiel, a collection of tubular bells, or an Indonesian gamelan.

Etymology and definition
Campanology is a hybrid word. The first half is derived from the Late Latin , meaning 'bell'; the second half is derived from the Ancient Greek  meaning 'the study of'.

A campanologist is one who studies campanology, though it is popularly misused to refer to a bell ringer.

Forms of bellringing

Full circle ringing

In English style (see below) full circle ringing, the bells in a church tower are hung so that on each stroke the bell swings through a complete circle; actually a little more than 360 degrees. Between strokes, it briefly sits poised 'upside-down', with the mouth pointed upwards; pulling on a rope connected to a large diameter wheel attached to the bell swings it down and the assembly's own momentum propels the bell back up again on the other side of the swing. Each alternate pull or stroke is identified as either handstroke or backstroke – handstroke where the "sally" (the fluffy area covered with wool) is pulled followed by a pull on the plain "tail". At East Bergholt in the English county of Suffolk, there is a unique set of bells that are not in a tower and are rung full circle by hand.

These rings of bells have relatively few bells, compared with a carillon; six or eight-bell towers are common, with the largest rings in numbering up to sixteen bells. The bells are usually tuned to fall in a diatonic scale without chromatic notes; they are traditionally numbered from the top downwards so that the highest bell (called the treble) is numbered 1 and the lowest bell (the tenor) has the highest number; it is usually the tonic note of the bells' scale.

To swing the heavy bells requires a ringer for each bell. Furthermore, the great inertias involved mean that a ringer has only a limited ability to retard or accelerate his/her bell's cycle. Along with the relatively limited palette of notes available, the upshot is that such rings of bells do not easily lend themselves to ringing melodies.

 
Instead, a system of change ringing evolved, probably early in the seventeenth century, which centres on mathematical permutations. The ringers begin with rounds, which is simply ringing down the scale in numerical order. (On six bells this would be 123456.) The ringing then proceeds in a series of rows or changes, each of which is some permutation of rounds  (for example 214365) where no bell changes by more than one position from the preceding row (this is also known as the Steinhaus–Johnson–Trotter algorithm).

In call change ringing, one of the ringers (known as the Conductor) calls out to tell the other ringers how to vary their order. The timing of the calls and changes of pattern accompanying them are made at the discretion of the Conductor and so do not necessarily involve a change of ringing sequence at each successive stroke as is characteristic of method ringing. Some ringers, notably in the West of England where there is a strong call-change tradition, ring call changes exclusively but for others, the essence of change ringing is the substantially different method ringing. As of 2015 there are 7,140 English style rings.  The Netherlands, Pakistan, India, and Spain have one each.  The Windward Isles and the Isle of Man have 2 each.  Canada and New Zealand 8 each.  The Channel Isles 10.  Africa as a continent has 13.  Scotland 24, Ireland 37, USA 48, Australia 59 and Wales 227.  The remaining 6,798 (95.2%) are in England (including three mobile rings).

Veronese bell ringing

Bolognese bell ringing

Change ringing

Method ringing

In method or scientific ringing each ringer has memorized a pattern describing his or her bell's course from row to row; taken together, these patterns (along with only occasional calls made by a conductor) form an algorithm which cycles through the various available permutations dictated by the number of bells available. There are hundreds of these methods which have been composed over the centuries and all have names, some being very fanciful. Better-known examples such as Plain Bob, Reverse Canterbury, Grandsire and Double Oxford are familiar to most ringers.

Serious ringing always starts and ends with rounds; and it must always be true — each row must be unique, never repeated. A performance of a few hundred rows or so is called a touch.  A performance of all the possible permutations possible on a set of bells is called an extent, with  bells there are ! possible permutations.  With five bells 5! = 120 which takes about 5 minutes.  With seven bells 7! = 5,040 which takes about three hours to ring.  This is the definition of a full peal on 7 (5,000 or more for other numbers of bells.)  Less demanding is the quarter peal of 1,260 changes.  When ringing peals and quarter peals on fewer bells several complete extents are rung consecutively.  When ringing on higher numbers of bells less than a complete extent is rung.  On eight bells the extent is 8!=40,320 which has only been accomplished once, taking nearly nineteen hours.

Ringing in English belltowers became a popular hobby in the late 17th century, in the Restoration era; the scientific approach which led to modern method ringing can be traced to two books of that era, Tintinnalogia or the Art of Ringing (published in 1668 by Richard Duckworth and Fabian Stedman) and Campanalogia (also by Stedman; first released 1677; see Bibliography). Today change ringing remains most popular in England but is practiced worldwide; over four thousand peals are rung each year.

Dorothy L. Sayers's mystery story, The Nine Tailors (1934) centres around change ringing of bells in a Fenland church; her father was a clergyman.

Russian Orthodox bellringing

The bells in Russian tradition are sounded by their clappers, attached to ropes; a special system of ropes is developed individually for every belltower. All the ropes are gathered in one place, where the bell-ringer stands. The ropes (usually all ropes) are not pulled, but rather pressed with hands or legs. Since one end of every rope is fixed, and the ropes are kept in tension, a press or even a punch on a rope makes a clapper move.

The Russian Tsar Bell is the largest extant bell in the world.

Carillons

Chimes

Ellacombe apparatus

The Ellacombe apparatus is an English mechanism devised for chiming by striking stationary bells with external hammers. However it does not have the same sound as full circle ringing due to the absence of the doppler effect derived from bell rotation and the lack of a damping effect of the clapper after each strike.

It requires only one person to operate. Each hammer is connected by a rope to a fixed frame in the bell-ringing room. When in use the ropes are taut, and pulling one of the ropes towards the player will strike the hammer against the bell. To enable normal full circle ringing on the same bells, the ropes are slackened to allow the hammers to drop away from the moving bells.

The system was devised in 1821 by Reverend Henry Thomas Ellacombe of Gloucestershire, who first had such a system installed in Bitton in 1822. He created the system to make conventional bell-ringers redundant, so churches did not have to tolerate the behaviour of what he thought were unruly bell-ringers.

However, in reality, it required very rare expertise for one person to ring changes. The sound of a chime was a poor substitute for the rich sound of swinging bells, and the apparatus fell out of fashion. Consequently, the Ellacombe apparatus has been disconnected or removed from many towers in the UK. In towers where the apparatus remains intact, it is generally used like a Carillon, but to play  simple tunes, or if expertise exists, to play changes.

Bellfounding

Bell tuning

The tuning of a bell is completely dependent on its shape. When first cast it is approximately correct, but it is then machined on a tuning lathe to remove metal until it is in tune. This is a very complex exercise which took centuries of empirical practice, and latterly modern acoustic science, to understand.

If a bell is part of a set to be rung or played together, then the initial dominant perceived sound, called the strike note, must be tuned to a designated note of a common scale. In addition each bell will emit harmonics, or partials, which must also be tuned so that these are not discordant with the bell's strike note. This is what Fuller-Maitland writing in Grove's dictionary of music and musicians meant when he said : "Good tone means that a bell must be in tune with itself."

The principal partials are;
 hum note -an octave below the strike note,  
 strike note
 tierce – minor third above the strike note 
 quint – perfect fifth above the strike note
 nominal – octave above the strike note

Further, less dominant, partials include the major, third and perfect fifth in the octave above these.

"Whether a founder tunes the nominal or the strike note makes little difference, however, because the nominal is one of the main partials that determines the tuning of the strike note." A heavy clapper brings out lower partials (clappers often being about 3% of a bell's mass), while a higher clapper velocity strengthens higher partials (0.4 m/s being moderate).  The relative depth of the "bowl" or "cup" part of the bell also determines the number and strength of the partials in order to achieve a desired timbre.

Bells are generally around 80% copper and 20% tin (bell metal), with the tone varying according to material.

Tone and pitch is also affected by the method in which a bell is struck. Asian large bells are often bowl shaped but lack the lip and are often not free-swinging. Also note the special shape of Bianzhong bells, allowing two tones. The scaling or size of most bells to each other may be approximated by the equation for circular cylinders:

f=Ch/D2,

where h is thickness, D is diameter, and C is a constant determined by the material and the profile.

The major third bell
On the theory that pieces in major keys may better be accommodated, after many unsatisfactory attempts, in the 1980s, using computer modeling for assistance in design by scientists at the Technical University in Eindhoven, bells with a major-third profile were created by the Royal Eijsbouts bell foundry in the Netherlands, being described as resembling old Coke bottles in that they have a bulge around the middle; and in 1999 a design without the bulge was announced.

Bell organizations

The following organizations promote the study, music, collection and/or preservation and restoration of bells. Nation(s) covered are given in parenthesis.
The American Bell Association International (United States with foreign chapters)
Association Campanaire Wallonne asbl (Belgium)
Associazione Italiana di Campanologia (Italy)
Associazione Suonatori di Campane a Sistema Veronese (Italy)
The Australian and New Zealand Association of Bellringers (Australia, New Zealand)
Beratungsausschuss für das Deutsche Glockenwesen (Germany)
British Carillon Society (United Kingdom)
The Central Council of Church Bell Ringers (UK)
Handbell Musicians of America (United States, chapter of English Handbell Ringers Association)
Handbell Ringers of Great Britain (United Kingdom)
Société Française de Campanologie (France)
Verband Deutscher Glockengießereien e.V. (Germany)
 (multinational)

See also
 Index of campanology articles

References

Bibliography
 
 
Dove's Guide for Church Bell Ringers (Dove's guide for church bell ringers to the ringing bells of Britain and of the world (2000))
Duckworth, Richard and Stedman, Fabian (1970) [1668] Tintinnalogia; or, The art of ringing, 1st ed. reprinted, Bath : Kingsmead Reprints,  
Ingram, Tom (1954) Bells of England. London: F. Muller
Stedman, F. (1990) [1677] Campanalogia : or The art of ringing improved ..., facsimile of 1st ed., Kettering : C. Groome, 
Walters, H. B. (1908) Church Bells. London: Mowbray
Wilson, Wilfrid G. (1965) Change Ringing: The Art and Science of Change Ringing on Church and Hand Bells. London: Faber

External links
 General
Bell Facts: Tools of Communication – Instruments of Music – Objects of Art
Gallery of medieval depictions of bells (Musiconis database, Université Paris-Sorbonne)
 Video of tuning a bell
 Video explaining bell tuning
 Carillons
The Carillon as a Musical Instrument, on the Web site of The Guild of Carillonneurs in North America (GCNA)
 Chimes
 Chimes and knells rung in traditional music from County of Nice, France
List of chimes in North America
 Russian Orthodox bells
 A collection of mp3 recordings of Russian Orthodox bells
 British bells
Discover Bell Ringing – an introduction for non-ringers
 Dove's Guide online
Tintinnalogia, or, the Art of Ringing by Richard Duckworth, Fabian Stedman (1671), from Project Gutenberg
Change Ringing Resources by Roger Bailey
Central Council of Church Bell Ringers
The Ringing World magazine
Indian Bells
Campanology in India: Bell Ringing, An Aid to Worship (in Hinduism) by S. Srikanta Sastri (1935)

Articles containing video clips
 
Music theory
Musicology